Solumsmoen is a Norwegian surname. Notable people with the surname include:

Odd Solumsmoen (1917–1986), Norwegian novelist and literary critic
Olaf Solumsmoen (1896–1972), Norwegian newspaper editor and politician

Norwegian-language surnames